James Beck Round Barn was a historic round barn located at Potter Township, Centre County, Pennsylvania. It was added to the National Register of Historic Places in 1978. It stood for 75 years, and despite plans for its restoration, after sustaining severe damage to the roof during a thunderstorm in 1984, the barn was leveled  and the site delisted in 1986.

History
The state of Pennsylvania currently has over 150 round barns and similar (i.e., octagonal) structures, the construction of which has spanned the course of nearly 200 years. Found peppered across 54 of the state's 67 counties, three such buildings have existed in Centre County. Two of these were registered as places of historical significance: the Neff Round Barn, located west of Centre Hall, and the James Beck Round Barn, east of Centre Hall.

Beck Round Barn was built in 1913 by Aaron Thomas, who in 1910 built the Calvin Neff Round Barn, also in Potter Township. The Beck property stood in Penns Valley near E. Penns Canal, approximately 8 miles from Centre Hall along Route 192. Like the Neff, it was a true round barn, i.e., no angles featured in the construction of its (circumferential) perimeter. The Beck measured 70 ft in diameter and 50 ft in height, had a conical roof with 4 gabled dormers and a cupola. Its interior featured 2 levels, a lower cattle floor and a mow floor above, and a central silo. The unpainted exterior was clad in vertical siding on the ground floor and horizontal on the upper.

Description
Local-area historian Harry Ward, board president of the Penns Valley Area Historical Museum Association, describes the barn's construction: 
"The top story was supported by timbers radiating outward from a central silo and resting on three concentric sills, which were each laminated from eight boards bent into a curve after soaking in water. Tapered radial rafters supported the shingled roof, which featured four windowed dormers. The peak of the roof featured a cupola, which was later replaced by a modern ventilator, and the central silo was removed." The James Beck Round barn had, at one time, been in the ownership of Ward's great-grandparents.

References

Round barns in Pennsylvania
Barns on the National Register of Historic Places in Pennsylvania
Infrastructure completed in 1913
Buildings and structures in Centre County, Pennsylvania
1913 establishments in Pennsylvania
National Register of Historic Places in Centre County, Pennsylvania

Former National Register of Historic Places in Pennsylvania